Gardel may refer to:

People
Carlos Gardel (1890–1935), French Argentine/Uruguayan singer, songwriter, composer and actor and most prominent figure in history of tango
Julio Sánchez Gardel (1879–1937), Argentine dramatist and writer
Maximilien Gardel (1741–1787), French ballet dancer and choreographer of German descent

Places
Gardel, Guadeloupe, settlement in Guadeloupe in commune of Le Moule